Kahnuj (also Romanized as Kahnūj) is a village in Sarbanan Rural District, in the Central District of Zarand County, Kerman Province, Iran. According to the 2006 census, its population was 297, in 75 families.

References 

Populated places in Zarand County